Jacob Aue Sobol (born 1976) is a Danish photographer. He has worked in East Greenland, Guatemala, Tokyo, Bangkok, Copenhagen, America and Russia. In 2007 Sobol became a nominee at Magnum Photos and a full member in 2012. Four monographs and many catalogues of his work have been published and widely exhibited including at Yossi Milo Gallery in New York and at the Diemar/Noble Photography Gallery in London.

Life and work
Born in Copenhagen, Sobol lived in Canada from 1994 to 1995. Back in Europe he first studied at the European Film College and from 1998 at Fatamorgana, the Danish School of Art Photography.

In the autumn of 1999 he went to the remote East Greenland village of Tiniteqilaaq to photograph. The visit was only supposed to last a few weeks but after meeting a local girl, Sabine, he returned the following year and stayed there for the next two years, living the life of a fisherman and hunter. In 2004 Sobol published Sabine, which in photographs and narrative portrays Sabine and describes his encounter with Greenlandic culture. The pictures in the book express the photographic idiom he developed at Fatamorgana.

In the summer of 2005, Sobol went with a film crew to Guatemala to make a documentary about a young Mayan girl's first trip to the ocean. The following year he returned to the mountains of Guatemala, this time by himself, to stay with an indigenous family for a month to document their everyday life.

In 2006 he moved to Tokyo to spend 18 months photographing the city for his book I, Tokyo. Commenting on the book, Miranda Gavin appreciates how "the sensitivity of his approach shines through the work and sets him apart as one of a new generation of photographers with the ability to allow eroticism and danger to seep through his images without becoming sordid or clichéd.

Sobol became a nominee of Magnum Photos in 2007 and a full member in 2012.

In 2008, Sobol worked in Bangkok where he photographed children fighting for survival in the Sukhumvit slums, despite the country's growing economic prosperity.

In 2009, he moved back to Copenhagen. Since then he has worked on projects at home as well as in America and Russia.

Publications

Books by Sobol
Sabine. With a text by Sobol and a foreword by Finn Thrane.
Copenhagen: Politiken, 2004. Danish. Edition of 700 copies.
Copenhagen: Politiken, 2004. Greenlandic. Edition of 200 copies.
Self-published, 2004. English. Edition of 200 copies.
I, Tokyo. Actes Sud (France), Apeiron (Greece), Dewi Lewis (UK), Braus (Germany), Lunwerg (Spain), Peliti (Italy), Mets & Schilt (Netherlands), 2008. .
Fortællinger = Stories. Kolofon / Colophone, 2011. Exhibition catalogue. Photographs from the series Sabine, I, Tokyo, Bangkok Encounter and Home.
Avec Toi. Maison du Danemark, 2013. . Exhibition catalogue.
Arrivals and Departures. Leica Gallery Warsaw, 2013. First edition. Exhibition catalogue.
Second edition. Leica Gallery Warsaw, 2015.
With You. Sienna: La Bottega Galleria, 2015. Exhibition catalogue.
12 Months of Winter Issue 1: January: Onse & Axel. Self-published / Brothas, 2016. Edition of 1000 copies.
12 Months of Winter Issue 2: February: Marcella. Self-published / Brothas, 2016. Edition of 1000 copies.
By the River of Kings. Tokyo: Super Labo, 2016. .
With and Without You. Tokyo: Super Labo, 2016. Photographs from his published series Sabine, The Gomez Brito Family, Arrivals and Departures, By the River of Kings, and I, Tokyo as well as from his then unpublished series Home, Road Of Bones and America.
Road of Bones. 2016. Catalogue format.
James-ip illua = James' House. Tokyo: Super Labo 2022. .

Publications paired with others
Veins. Stockport, Cheshire: Dewi Lewis, 2013. . With Anders Petersen. With a text by Gerry Badger.

Publications with contributions by Sobol
On Daido: An homage by photographers & writers. Kassel: FBF. Photographs by Sobol, Morten Andersen, Nobuyoshi Araki, Machiel Botman, Krass Clement, Antoine D’Agata, JH Engström, Stephen Gill, John Gossage, Todd Hido, Takashi Homma, Osamu Kanemura, Rinko Kawauchi, Keizo Kitajima, Takuma Nakahira, Asako Naharashi, Mika Ninagawa, Katsumi Omori, Koji Onaka, Martin Parr, Anders Petersen, André Principe, Leo Rubinfien, Ken Schles, Joachim Schmid, Oliver Sieber, Alec Soth, Katja Stuke, Aya Takada, Ali Taptik, and Terri Weifenbach. Edition of 500 copies.

Awards

 2005: Deutsche Börse Photography Prize nominations for Sabine
 2006: World Press Photo Award in the Daily Life Stories category,  for the Guatemala series
 2007: Fogtdal Photographers Award
 2008: Nominated, Paul Huf Award
 2008: Leica European Publishers Award for Photography for I, Tokyo
 2009: UNICEF Germany Photo of the Year Awards: Honorable Mention

Exhibitions

 2003: Tiniteqilaaq – The strait that runs dry at low tide, Odense Phototriennale, Denmark.
 2004: Sabine, Frederiks Bastion, Copenhagen, Denmark.
 2004: Sabine, Superdanish, Festival of Danish Art,  Toronto, Canada.
 2006: Sabine, Open Eye Gallery, Liverpool, UK.
 2006: Sabine, Yours Gallery, Warsaw, Poland.
 2007: Sabine, Gallery Sztuki, Konin, Poland.
 2007: Sabine, Month of Photography, Kraków, Poland.
 2007: Sabine, Silo Gallery, Porto, Portugal.
 2008: I, Tokyo, Brandts Museum of Photographic Art, Odense, Denmark.
 2009: I, Tokyo, Rencontres d'Arles, Arles, France.
 2010: Sabine & I, Tokyo, Yossi Milo Gallery, NY.
 2012: Arrivals and Departures, Leica Gallery Washington, D.C.
 2013: Arrivals and Departures, Leica Gallery Prague, Czech Republic.

Notes

References

External links

Aue Sobol at Magnum Photos

1976 births
Living people
21st-century Danish photographers
Danish photographers
Photography in Japan
Magnum photographers